Clifford Harold Hansen (June 29, 1910 – November 11, 2001) was an American football player. He played college football at Luther College and professional football in the National Football League (NFL) as a halfback for the Chicago Cardinals. He appeared in five NFL games during the 1933 season.

References

1910 births
2001 deaths
Chicago Cardinals players
Players of American football from Minnesota